IFK Lane is a Swedish football club located in Lane-Ryr, Uddevalla.

Background
IFK Lane currently plays in Division 4 Bohuslän/Dalsland which is the sixth tier of Swedish football. They play their home matches at the Lanevallen in Lane-Ryr, Uddevalla.

The club is affiliated to Bohusläns Fotbollförbund. IFK Lane have competed in the Svenska Cupen on 3 occasions and have played 5 matches in the competition.

Season to season

Footnotes

External links
 IFK Lane – Official website

Football clubs in Västra Götaland County
Association football clubs established in 1935
1935 establishments in Sweden
Idrottsföreningen Kamraterna